Pleurotomella bezoyensis is an extinct species of sea snail, a marine gastropod mollusk in the family Raphitomidae.

Description

Distribution
Fossils of this marine species were found in Oligocene strata in Aquitaine, France.

References

External links
 Lozouet P. (2017). Les Conoidea de l'Oligocène supérieur (Chattien) du bassin de l'Adour (Sud-Ouest de la France). Cossmanniana. 19: 3-180

bezoyensis
Gastropods described in 2017